Myrciaria disticha is a species of plant in the family Myrtaceae. It is endemic to the east of Brazil. The plant is a semideciduous shrub or small tree that grows to between 4 and 6 metres tall, and produces edible, reddish berries around 10mm in diameter.

References

disticha
Crops originating from the Americas
Tropical fruit
Flora of South America
Endemic flora of Brazil
Fruits originating in South America
Cauliflory
Fruit trees
Berries